"One More Time" is a song by Australian rock musician, Diesel. It was ireleased as the fifth and final single from his debut album Hepfidelity (1992).
It peaked at number 59 in Australia and 39 in New Zealand.

Track listing
 CD Single
 "One More Time" - 4:07	
 "One More Time"  (Acoustic) - 3:40

Charts

Weekly charts

References

External links

Chrysalis Records singles
1992 singles
1991 songs
Diesel (musician) songs
Songs written by Diesel (musician)